LMG, LLC is an American provider of video, audio, LED, and lighting support. The company was founded in 1984 by Les Goldberg. LMG is divided into four brands: LMG, Systems Innovation by LMG, LMG Touring & Entertainment and LMG Venues. It is a subsidiary of Entertainment Technology Partners.

History

LMG was founded by Les M. Goldberg in March 1984 to support audiovisual rentals associated with live events. The Systems Integration division launched in 1993, and rebranded as Systems Innovation in 2019, to provide direct audiovisual custom installations. In 1998, LMG became the onsite provider for audiovisual services at the Orange County Convention Center, located in Orlando, Florida. In 2005, LMG created the first multiformat, high-definition "truck in a box" flypack system, dubbed HD-1, for corporate events, and later built three additional systems designed around the Snell & Wilcox Kahuna broadcasting switcher.

A new division, LMG Touring, was launched in 2007 by providing audio support for the company's first major world concert tour. LMG won the audiovisual contract at Music City Center in Nashville in 2013. In 2014, LMG was awarded the onsite, preferred audiovisual supplier at the Orange County Convention Center in Orlando, Florida for a fourth term, securing presence at the facility through 2020.

In 2014, Entertainment Technology Partners formed to assemble a collection of brands in the audiovisual technology industry and became the parent company to LMG. That same year, LMG also built the first 4K Ultra HD System of its kind for live corporate events. The completely mobile package supports a 4K UHD signal through each component of the system for an output of 8,294,400 pixels.

In 2015, CEO Les M. Goldberg published a book entitled, "Don't Take No for an Answer: Anything is Possible." LMG was awarded the onsite audiovisual supplier at the Washington State Convention Center in Seattle, Washington in 2017. In early 2018, LMG acquired Silicon Valley-based company AV-Integrators, extending the LMG presence into Northern California. In 2019, CEO Les M. Goldberg published his second book, "When All the Stars Align: Create a Life Where Great Things Happen.". In 2020, LMG was awarded the contract for preferred audiovisual supplier for San Jose McEnery Convention Center. In 2021, LMG was again awarded the contract as the onsite, preferred audio-visual partner at the Music City Center (MCC) as well as the Orange County Convention Center (OCCC). In 2022, LMG won the audiovisual contract at the 1 Hotel Nashville, their first hotel contract. Later that year, LMG purchased land in Austin, Texas and announced plans to build their 11th location. LMG Venues was formed in 2022 to deliver high-end audiovisual services for their venues and convention centers.

Founder 
Les Goldberg is the Chief Executive Officer, President and Founder of LMG, LLC. Goldberg is also the Chairman of  Entertainment Technology Partners, LLC. He started the company in 1984 at the age of seventeen. Goldberg was an Orlando Business Journal’s Top 40 under 40 Honoree, 1998 and 2005.

Brands 
LMG offers full-service video, audio, and lighting capabilities throughout the United States for corporate meetings, trade shows, live broadcasts, and specialty events.

LMG Touring & Entertainment provides integrated audio, video, lighting, and satellite web streaming for concert tours.

LMG Systems Innovation provides consultation, design, and installation of permanent audiovisual solutions.

LMG Venues provides audio, video, lighting, and LED capabilities in select convention centers and venues across the United States for corporate meetings, trade shows, live broadcasts, and specialty events.

Awards 
 2006 – INFOCOMM International, Best Use of HD for 2005 Discovery Communications Upfront Tour.
 2007 – INFOCOMM International, Best Overall Staging for a Corporate Event for Rite Aid Annual Conference.
 2008 – INFOCOMM International, Best Overall Staging for a Corporate Event for AutoDesk One Team Conference.
 2012 – INFOCOMM International, Best Overall Staging for a Corporate Event for 2011 BlackBerry World event.
 2013 – Tour Link, Top Dog Award for Best Regional Production Company, East.
 2013 – Event Tech Awards, Bronze for Best Use of Projection Mapping for Walmart's 2013 Shareholders' Meeting.
 2013 – Parnelli Awards, Video Rental Company of the Year for work on Train's Mermaids of Alcatraz tour.
 2013 – Event Design Awards, Gold Winner, with Tencue, for Best Stage at a B-to-B Event/Meeting for Autodesk.
 2013 – Event Design Awards, with Tencue, for Best Use of A/V for Autodesk.
 2014 – Event Tech Awards, Bronze for Best Use of A/V for Discovery Communications 2014 Upfront. 
 2015 –  APEX Awards, Bronze for Best Digital Signage Connection for EMC World 2014.
 2016 –  Live Design Excellence Award, Winner of Concert Category for J.Cole's Forest Hills Drive Tour.
 2019 - Orlando Business Journal's Coolest Office Space

References

External links
 www.lmg.net

Companies based in Orlando, Florida
Entertainment companies established in 1984
1984 establishments in Florida